Cape Espiritu Santo, also known as Cape Espiritu Santo Mountains, is the northeastern point of the Northern Samar and the northernmost point of Samar Island. It was named Cabo Espiritu Santo by early European explorers, since it was discovered on the Feast of the Holy Spirit. It is also the first land sighted by the Spaniards when sailing from Nueva España, marks the end of their long sailing as they approaches the land and coast of the Ibabaw in the Philippines. Spanish navigators noted the mountains' value as they are visible 40 miles out to sea. There are two prominent summits in this location. One rises  and the other .

References 

Espiritu Santo
Landforms of Northern Samar